Jordan Hunter (born 20 August 1990) is a professional basketball player from New Zealand. She played for the Adelaide Lightning in the WNBL in 2016–17.

Career

College
In 2010, Hunter began her college career at Crowder College in Neosho, Missouri for the Roughriders. Strong showings earned her a transfer to Southeast Missouri State University in Cape Girardeau, Missouri to play for the Redhawks.

WNBL
Hunter played for the Adelaide Lightning in the 2016–17 WNBL season.

National team
Hunter is a long time representative of the New Zealand national team. She made her debut for the Tall Ferns at the 2011 FIBA Oceania Championship.

References

1990 births
Living people
Guards (basketball)
New Zealand women's basketball players
Adelaide Lightning players
Basketball players at the 2018 Commonwealth Games
Commonwealth Games bronze medallists for New Zealand
Commonwealth Games medallists in basketball
Medallists at the 2018 Commonwealth Games